Iva (minor planet designation: 497 Iva) is a main-belt asteroid orbiting the Sun, not to be confused with 1627 Ivar. It was discovered by American astronomer R. S. Dugan on 4 November 1902, and was named for Iva Shores, the young daughter of the family where he was staying in Heidelberg. The orbital plane is inclined at an angle of 4.8° to the plane of the ecliptic.

This asteroid is classified as an M-type asteroid and is considered anhydrous but oxidized. Further analysis of the spectra suggests the "presence of either an olivine or high-Ca pyroxene phase
in addition to orthopyroxene ± Type B clinopyroxene".

References

External links 
 Lightcurve plot of 497 Iva, Palmer Divide Observatory, B. D. Warner (2009)
 Asteroid Lightcurve Database (LCDB), query form (info )
 Dictionary of Minor Planet Names, Google books
 Asteroids and comets rotation curves, CdR – Observatoire de Genève, Raoul Behrend
 Discovery Circumstances: Numbered Minor Planets (1)-(5000) – Minor Planet Center
 
 

Background asteroids
Iva
Iva
M-type asteroids (Tholen)
19021104